Solec nad Wisłą  is a town in Lipsko County, Masovian Voivodeship, in east-central Poland. It is the seat of the gmina (administrative district) called Gmina Solec nad Wisłą. The town has a population of 1,650, and is located on the Vistula river, in historic Lesser Poland. Solec maintains the character of a small town, with a traditional market square, a feature of other ancient European towns.

History

In its early days, Solec used to be called Solca, and the name most probably comes from trading of salt, which took place here. The town was also called Solec Sandomierski and Solec Radomski, and in the 19th century, the name Solec nad Wisłą was accepted, to distinguish it from other places, such as Solec Kujawski.

Solec has a long history, it was first mentioned in 1138 in the Bull of Gniezno, and at that time, it belonged to the Archbishop of Gniezno. In the 12th century the village belonged to the Order of the Holy Sepulchre, and in 1325 it was purchased by King Władysław I the Elbow-high. In 1347 King Casimir the Great granted it Magdeburg rights, building here a castle and renovating a parish church. Solec nad Wisłą was administratively located in the Radom County in the Sandomierz Voivodeship in the Lesser Poland Province of the Polish Crown.

In the 15th and 16th centuries Solec emerged as a local salt trade center. It organized fairs and enjoyed several privileges, confirmed by King Sigismund I the Old. In 1615–1627 Krzysztof Zbaraski rebuilt the castle in Renaissance style and founded a monastery. During the Swedish invasion of Poland (1655–1660) the prosperous town and the castle were completely destroyed - out of 246 houses, only 6 remained after the war. The town began to slowly recover in the 18th century. It was annexed by Austria in the Third Partition of Poland in 1795. In 1809, after the Polish victory in the Austro-Polish War, it was included within the short-lived Polish Duchy of Warsaw, and after its dissolution, in 1815, it passed to Russian-controlled Congress Poland. After the unsuccessful Polish January Uprising Solec was deprived of its town charter (1869), which was restored in 2021. After World War I, in 1918, Poland regained independence and control of the settlement.

Following the joint German-Soviet invasion of Poland, which started World War II in September 1939, Solec was occupied by Germany until 1945. The Germans established and operated a Baudienst forced labour camp for Poles in Solec.

Sights
Among points of interest there are:
 14th-century Gothic parish church, remodelled in the 16th and 17th centuries, with a late Renaissance altar,
 complex of former monastery (1624), which has belonged to the state since 1864,
 St. Barbara cemetery with a Baroque cemetery church, 
 several roadside chapels, with the oldest one from 1784,
 ruins of a 14th-century castle, which guarded the Vistula crossing. In 1615-1627 the castle was remodelled by Krzysztof Zbaraski, and in 1655 - 1660 it was completely destroyed, together with whole town of Solec,
 18th-century houses in the market square,
 19th-century town hall.

Sports
The local football club is Wisła Solec. It competes in the lower leagues.

References

External links
 Jewish Community in Solec nad Wisłą on Virtual Shtetl

Cities and towns in Masovian Voivodeship
Lipsko County
Lesser Poland
Radom Governorate
Kielce Voivodeship (1919–1939)